16 Days of Glory is a 1985 documentary film about the 1984 Summer Olympics in Los Angeles, California, United States directed by Bud Greenspan. Among the athletes it profiles are Mary Lou Retton, Edwin Moses, Carl Lewis, Greg Louganis and Michael Groß.

There are multiple versions of the film, including a theatrical version running almost 2.5 hours, and a six-hour TV version that was shown on PBS as a six-part mini-series in July 1988.

The film premiered at the Academy of Motion Picture Arts and Sciences' Samuel Goldwyn Theater in Beverly Hills, California on July 29, 1985. It had a two-week Oscar qualifying run in Santa Monica, California beginning October 23, 1985, and opened in New York City on March 7, 1986, grossing $84,000. Its television premiere was on The Disney Channel on January 24, 1987.

References

External links

1985 films
1985 documentary films
American sports documentary films
1980s English-language films
Documentary films about the Olympics
Films about the 1984 Summer Olympics
Documentary films about Los Angeles
Paramount Pictures films
1980s American films